Giani Marian Alberto Stere (born 14 July 1999) is a Romanian professional footballer who plays as a centre-forward.

References

External links
 
 Giani Stere at lpf.ro

1999 births
Living people
People from Bucharest
Romanian footballers
Association football wingers
Liga I players
Liga II players
Liga III players
ACS Poli Timișoara players
FC Dinamo București players
FC Metaloglobus București players